The 2000 Estonian Figure Skating Championships were held in Tallinn from December 3 to 5, 1999. Skaters competed in the disciplines of men's singles, ladies' singles, pair skating, and ice dancing on the senior and junior levels.

Senior results

Men

Ladies

Pairs

Junior results
The 2000 Estonian Junior Figure Skating Championships took place in Tallinn from January 22 through 23, 2000.

Men

Ladies
11 participants

Ice dancing

References

Figure Skating Championships
1999 in figure skating
Estonian Figure Skating Championships, 2000
Estonian Figure Skating Championships